Tell Salhab Subdistrict  is a Syrian nahiyah (subdistrict) located in Al-Suqaylabiyah District in Hama.  According to the Syria Central Bureau of Statistics (CBS), Tell Salhab Subdistrict had a population of 38,783 in the 2004 census.

References 

Tell Salhab
Al-Suqaylabiyah District